Flowers and Trees is a 1932 Silly Symphonies cartoon produced by Walt Disney, directed by Burt Gillett, and released to theatres by United Artists on July 30, 1932. It was the first commercially released film to be produced in the full-color three-strip Technicolor process after several years of two-color Technicolor films. The film was a commercial and critical success, winning the first Academy Award for Best Cartoon Short Subject.

In 2021, the film was selected for preservation in the United States National Film Registry by the Library of Congress for being "culturally, historically, or aesthetically significant".

Plot
During spring the flowers, mushrooms, and trees do their calisthenics. Some trees play a tune, using vines for harp strings and a chorus of robins. A fight breaks out between a waspish-looking hollow tree and a younger, healthier tree for the attention of a female tree. The young tree emerges victorious, but the hollow tree retaliates by starting a fire. The plants and animals try to extinguish or evade the blaze. By poking holes in clouds and making it rain, the birds manage to put out the fire, although the hollow tree perishes in the flames after getting caught up in them himself. The young tree then proposes to the female tree, with a caterpillar serving as a ring, and they embrace as a 12-color rainbow forms behind them.

Production
In May 1932, the first three-strip Technicolor camera was completed. Herbert Kalmus wanted to test it in the animation field, giving the company time to build enough cameras to offer the whole movie industry, but could not find any interested animators. Finally, Walt Disney agreed to try it as an experiment on Flowers and Trees, which was already in production in black-and-white, and ordered the cartoon redone in color. The color animation caused the production to run over budget, potentially ruining Disney financially, but the cartoon proved so popular that the profits made up for the budget overage.

Impact
As a result of the success of Flowers and Trees, all future Silly Symphonies cartoons were produced in three-strip Technicolor. The added novelty of color helped to boost the series' previously disappointing returns. Disney's other cartoon series, the Mickey Mouse shorts, were deemed successful enough not to need the extra boost of color, remaining in black-and-white until The Band Concert (1935).

Disney's exclusive contract with Technicolor, in effect until the end of 1935, forced other animation producers such as Ub Iwerks (Disney's former head animator and close friend) and Max Fleischer to use Technicolor's inferior two-color process or a competing two-color system such as Cinecolor.

Accolades 
Flowers and Trees was the first animated film to win an Academy award at the fifth Academy Awards in 1932. It won best "Short Subjects, Cartoons", a category first introduced that year.

Home media
The short was released on December 4, 2001 on Walt Disney Treasures: Silly Symphonies - The Historic Musical Animated Classics.

References

External links
''Flowers and Trees in The Encyclopedia of Disney Animated Shorts

1932 films
1932 short films
1930s color films
1932 comedy films
Best Animated Short Academy Award winners
1930s Disney animated short films
Silly Symphonies
1932 animated films
Films directed by Burt Gillett
Films produced by Walt Disney
Films about trees
Animated films without speech
United States National Film Registry films
1930s English-language films
1930s American films